The D'Entrecasteaux class is a class of oceanic patrol ships of the French Navy. The ship's designation is Bâtiment multi-mission (B2M) in French, meaning "multi-mission ship",  and sometimes dubbed the "Swiss Army knife of the Navy". The ship is designed to perform sovereignty, law enforcement and logistics missions (such as policing illegal fishing, offshore traffic and resource mining, assisting distressed ships, search and rescue, and contributing to the logistics of Overseas collectivities and departments.). The class replaced the aging s in some of these roles. The D'Entrecasteaux-class perform  similar roles in French overseas territories that the four Loire-class ships perform in Metropolitan France.

Three units were initially planned, but a fourth one was ordered in early 2015, to cover the Mozambique Channel. The French Navy's first Bâtiment multi-mission (B2M) ship, d'Entrecasteaux, was delivered at the end of March 2016. The B2M vessels can be armed with two 12.7x99 mm (.50 cal.) machine guns.

History

Missions and background 
France holds the largest exclusive economic zones (EEZ), totalling one million km² in the Indian Ocean and 1.7 million km² in the Southern Ocean. More recently, the French Navy has procured classes of ship specifically designed for law enforcement and public service in the EEZ, such as the s.

In the 2010s, the aging BATRAL, based in Nouméa, was decommissioned in April 2013 and the decommissioning of Albatros in May 2015 led to the need to procure replacements for the naval stations of Port des Galets (La Réunion), Nouméa (New Caledonia), Dégrad des Cannes (Martinique) and Papeete (French Polynesia). In March 2006, the Service des Programmes Navals (SPN, "Naval Programme Service") started to study a replacement for the five BATRALs and for Albatros.

The ships initially envisioned would have been typed Bâtiments d'intervention et de souveraineté (BIS, "Intervention and Sovereignty Ships"); although they were to dispense with the amphibious capabilities of the BATRAL, they were to accommodate a company-sized force (120 men and 20 vehicles, including armoured vehicles). 
Four projects were evaluated, including the "MultiPurpose Projection Vessel" by CNIM, the "Echoship" by DCNS, the M.OPV by Piriou, and the UT 527 by Rolls-Royce Marine. 
In October 2013, a modified version of the M.OPV was co-contracted to Piriou and DCNS; a joint venture, Kership, was founded for the project.

Expenses of the contract, amounting to 100 million euro, were initially to be covered not only by the Ministry of Defence, but also by other branches of the government: 20% of the funds to acquire the ships and 50% of the maintenance would have been provided by other ministries. However, from July 2013, it was decided that the Ministry of Defence had to shoulder the burden alone.

Design 
The design selected for the Bâtiment multi-mission eschews the amphibious capabilities of the previous BATRAL and the L-CAT design proposed by CNIM, similar to the Engin de débarquement amphibie rapide, for a concept of platform supply vessel, or anchor handling tug supply vessel. In line with most ship designs tasked for coastguard duty in the French Navy, the B2M will be built according to civilian standards; this was already the case notably for the Floréal class. The hulls are built in Poland, Piriou being tasked with the design of the ship proper and the finish in Concarneau, while DCNS work on the military aspects of the project.

Features and capabilities 
The B2M are designed for a range of low-intensity, high-endurance missions in the French EEZ, from bases in the Overseas collectivities. One of their main task is maritime law enforcement, particularly in the domain of commercial fishing and against illegal immigration, Drug trafficking and piracy.

The B2M provide a limited capability of power projection, as they can ferry a 20-man force, along with equipment and two vehicles; as the missions of the B2M are joint between the various ministries responsible for the maritime actions of the State, these forces can belong to any arm of the French Military, to the Gendarmerie or the Police. They carry an  boat and several rigid-hulled inflatable boats, and can deploy frogmen as well as remotely operated underwater vehicles. The ship can also accommodate a medical team to be deployed during humanitarian emergencies.

To assist ships of distress, the B2M can develop a 30-tonne bollard pull and have extensive anti-fire capabilities. This allows autonomous loading and unloading of standard containers, a useful capability for humanitarian operations in disaster areas.

Operational service 
D'Entrecasteaux was severely damaged by fire in July 2021. The loss of the ship for an undetermined period temporarily left the French Navy with no operational vessel in the waters around New Caledonia due to the simultaneous incapacitation of the surveillance frigate  and the patrol vessel . To address the gap, her sister ship Bougainville was temporarily redeployed from Tahiti to New Caledonia. By early 2022, La Glorieuse was again active while D'Entrecasteaux was repaired and declared operational once again in May 2022.

Ships

Notes and references

Patrol vessels of the French Navy